Gereli is a village in Ödemiş district of İzmir Province, Turkey. It is situated to the east of Ödemiş. The population of Gereli is 1097. as of 2011.

References

Populated places in İzmir Province
Towns in Turkey
Ödemiş District